The 1990–91 NBA season was the Warriors' 45th season in the National Basketball Association, and 28th in the San Francisco Bay Area. The trio of Chris Mullin, Mitch Richmond, and second-year star Tim Hardaway were given the name "Run TMC" during the season. In the opening game, the Warriors defeated the Denver Nuggets 162–158, the highest-scoring regulation game in NBA history. Despite their scoring prowess, the Warriors were limited defensively. The team got off to a solid start winning seven of their first nine games, but later on played around .500 along the way. On February 26, 1991, they lost 131–119 to the Orlando Magic despite the Run TMC trio each scoring more than 30 points (the rest of the team totaled 21 points). At midseason, the team signed rookie guard Mario Elie after a brief stint with the Philadelphia 76ers. The Warriors held a 26–20 record at the All-Star break, and won their final five games of the season, finishing fourth in the Pacific Division with a 44–38 record.

Mullin averaged 25.7 points, 5.4 rebounds and 2.1 steals per game, and was named to the All-NBA Second Team, while Richmond averaged 23.9 points, 5.9 rebounds and 1.6 steals per game, and Hardaway provided the team with 22.9 points, 9.7 assists and 2.6 steals per game. Mullin and Hardaway were both selected for the 1991 NBA All-Star Game. In addition, second-year guard Sarunas Marciulionis contributed 10.9 points per game off the bench, and sixth man Rod Higgins provided with 9.5 points per game off the bench.

In the Western Conference First Round of the playoffs, the Warriors lost Game 1 to the 2nd-seeded San Antonio Spurs on the road, 130–121, but would again pull off an upset by winning the next three games, thus the series. However, they would lose to Magic Johnson and the Los Angeles Lakers, four games to one in the Western Conference Semi-finals. The Lakers would lose in five games to the Chicago Bulls in the NBA Finals.

Draft picks

Roster

Regular season

Season standings

y - clinched division title
x - clinched playoff spot

z - clinched division title
y - clinched division title
x - clinched playoff spot

Record vs. opponents

Game log

Playoffs

|- align="center" bgcolor="#ffcccc"
| 1
| April 25
| @ San Antonio
| L 121–130
| Mullin, Richmond (29)
| Chris Mullin (8)
| Tim Hardaway (8)
| HemisFair Arena15,908
| 0–1
|- align="center" bgcolor="#ccffcc"
| 2
| April 27
| @ San Antonio
| W 111–98
| Chris Mullin (27)
| Chris Mullin (7)
| Tim Hardaway (9)
| HemisFair Arena15,908
| 1–1
|- align="center" bgcolor="#ccffcc"
| 3
| May 1
| San Antonio
| W 109–106
| Mitch Richmond (27)
| Tim Hardaway (8)
| Tim Hardaway (11)
| Oakland–Alameda County Coliseum Arena15,025
| 2–1
|- align="center" bgcolor="#ccffcc"
| 4
| May 3
| San Antonio
| W 110–97
| Tim Hardaway (32)
| Mitch Richmond (11)
| Tim Hardaway (9)
| Oakland–Alameda County Coliseum Arena15,025
| 3–1
|-

|- align="center" bgcolor="#ffcccc"
| 1
| May 5
| @ L.A. Lakers
| L 116–126
| Tim Hardaway (33)
| Alton Lister (8)
| Hardaway, Marciulionis (9)
| Great Western Forum17,505
| 0–1
|- align="center" bgcolor="#ccffcc"
| 2
| May 8
| @ L.A. Lakers
| W 125–124
| Chris Mullin (41)
| Jim Petersen (7)
| Tim Hardaway (14)
| Great Western Forum17,505
| 1–1
|- align="center" bgcolor="#ffcccc"
| 3
| May 10
| L.A. Lakers
| L 112–115
| Richmond, Hardaway (24)
| Chris Mullin (11)
| Tim Hardaway (12)
| Oakland–Alameda County Coliseum Arena15,025
| 1–2
|- align="center" bgcolor="#ffcccc"
| 4
| May 12
| L.A. Lakers
| L 107–123
| Mitch Richmond (26)
| Richmond, Mullin (6)
| Tim Hardaway (9)
| Oakland–Alameda County Coliseum Arena
| 1–3
|- align="center" bgcolor="#ffcccc"
| 5
| May 14
| @ L.A. Lakers
| L 119–124 (OT)
| Tim Hardaway (27)
| Mullin, Lister (8)
| Tim Hardaway (20)
| Great Western Forum17,505
| 1–4
|-

Player statistics

Season

Playoffs

Awards and records
 Chris Mullin, NBA All-Star Game
 Tim Hardaway, NBA All-Star Game
 Chris Mullin, All-NBA Second Team

Transactions

References

See also
 1990-91 NBA season

Golden State Warriors seasons
Golden
Golden
Golden State